Alipur, is a tehsil (an administrative subdivision) of Muzaffargarh District that falls in DG Khan Division, in the Punjab province of Pakistan. Its capital is Alipur City. Alipur was a Panwar Rajput state till 1701. Later this territory came under control of newly established nawabs of Muzaffargarh.

Administration
The tehsil of Alipur is administratively subdivided into 20  Union Councils, these are:

  Damar wala Janobi 
  Alipur Merani  
  Alipur Urban  
  Ali wali
  Bait Mullanwali
  Bazwala
  ٖLatti
  Fateh pur Janubi
  Ghalwan
  Khair pur Sadat
  Khangarh Doma
  Basti Disi
  Mission Kot Bhowa
  Muradpur Janubi 
  Gabbar Arrain 
  Seet pur
  Sultanpur
  Yakaywali
  Banda Shah 
  Basti Badani Khair pur sadaat

References

Tehsils of Punjab, Pakistan